The 2012 season was the New Orleans Saints' 46th in the National Football League and their 37th playing home games at the Superdome. It would have been their seventh season under head coach Sean Payton, but he was suspended by the NFL for the entire season as part of the punishment for the team's bounty scandal. On April 12, 2012, linebackers coach Joe Vitt was named interim head coach to replace Payton while he was suspended. On August 22, 2012, it was announced that Aaron Kromer would take over while Vitt himself served a six-game suspension to start the regular season. The Saints attempted to make history as the first host team to play the Super Bowl on their own home field, but they were eliminated from post-season contention for the first time since 2008 in Week 16. The Saints set an NFL record for most yards given up by a defense, 7,042 yards, surpassing the 1981 Baltimore Colts record of 6,793 yards.

Personnel changes

After his contract expired, defensive coordinator Gregg Williams was hired by the St. Louis Rams to the same position on January 16, 2012. Former Rams' head coach Steve Spagnuolo replaced Williams. Williams was later handed an indefinite suspension from the NFL for his role in the bounty scandal.

Roster changes

Signings
All signings were to active roster, except where otherwise noted.

Draft

The Saints did not have a first- or second-round selection.

NOTES
 The team traded its 2012 first-round selection and a 2011 second-round selection to the New England Patriots in exchange for the Patriots' 2011 first-round selection.
 The team forfeited their second-round selections in 2012 and 2013 as part of the punishment for the team's bounty scandal.
 The team swapped picks in the sixth round with the Miami Dolphins as part of the Reggie Bush trade.

Undrafted free agents
All undrafted free agents were signed just after the 2012 NFL Draft concluded on April 28.

Staff

Final roster

Schedule

Preseason

Regular season

Note: Intra-division opponents are in bold text.

Game summaries

Week 1: vs. Washington Redskins

With the loss, the Saints started their season 0–1.

Week 2: at Carolina Panthers

With the loss, the Saints fell to 0–2.

Week 3: vs. Kansas City Chiefs

With the close loss, the Saints fell to 0–3.

Week 4: at Green Bay Packers

With the loss, the Saints faced their first 0–4 start since 2007.

Week 5: vs. San Diego Chargers

Drew Brees broke Johnny Unitas' record of consecutive games with a touchdown in the first quarter. The record touchdown was witnessed by Unitas' son Joe. With the surprising win, the Saints go into their bye week at 1–4.

Week 7: at Tampa Bay Buccaneers

With the win, the Saints improved to 2–4. Also, QB Drew Brees increased his number of consecutive games with a touchdown pass to 49.

Week 8: at Denver Broncos

With the loss, the Saints fell to 2–5. However, despite the loss, QB Drew Brees increased his record of consecutive games with a touchdown pass to 50.

Week 9: vs. Philadelphia Eagles

With the win, the Saints improved to 3–5. Also, QB Drew Brees increased his streak of games with at least one passing touchdown to 51.

Week 10: vs. Atlanta Falcons

After their huge win over the Eagles, the Saints stayed home for a game against their heated rival Falcons. Sitting at 3–5, the Falcons came into this game at 8–0. The Saints surprisingly won their 4th-straight game against the Falcons and improved their record to 4–5 while the Falcons dropped to 8–1. Drew Brees brought his total of games with a passing touchdown to 52.

Week 11: at Oakland Raiders

After 2 straight dominant home wins, the Saints traveled to Oakland to take on the Raiders. The Saints again dominated this game after the Raiders took the first points of the game. The Saints would win and improve to 5–5 on the season keeping their playoff hopes alive. Also Drew Brees brought his streak of at least 1 passing touchdown in a single game to 53.

Week 12: vs. San Francisco 49ers

The loss dropped the team to 5–6, but Brees' record of games with at least 1 passing touchdown stood at 54. This loss was brought up by the ejection of nose tackle Brodrick Bunkley.

Week 13: at Atlanta Falcons

After the tough home loss to the Niners, the Saints traveled to take on the Falcons in a TNF matchup. The Saints' 4-game winning streak against the Falcons would be snapped as the team dropped to 5–7. Also, QB Drew Brees' streak of consecutive games with at least 1 passing touchdown would come to an end as he threw a career-high 5 interceptions in one game on the night. Regardless, his total passing touchdowns at this point was 31 bringing him his 5th straight season with 30+ passing touchdowns.

Week 14: at New York Giants
The Saints weren't able to beat defending Super Bowl Champions, New York Giants. They fell to 5-8 with the loss.

Week 15: vs. Tampa Bay Buccaneers
 With the win, The Saints improved to 6–8 and swept the Buccaneers for the first time since 2006 and posted their first shutout win since 1995 to the New York Jets 12–0. The Saints did not post another shutout until 2021, when they beat the Buccaneers 9-0.

Week 16: at Dallas Cowboys

With the win, the Saints improved to 7–8. However, the Saints were eliminated from postseason contention, thus rendering them unable to play Super Bowl XLVII on their own home turf.

Week 17: vs. Carolina Panthers

With the loss, the Saints finished with their first losing season since 2007 at 7–9. Also, the team was swept by the Panthers for the first time since 2008.

Standings

References

External links

 2012 New Orleans Saints at Pro-Football-Reference.com

New Orleans
New Orleans Saints seasons
New